Ellie Koyander (born Elleanor Koyander on 23 March 1991) is a British Olympic mogul skier who competed in the 2010 Winter Olympics.

Early life
She was born in Chesterfield.

She trained with the Sharks Ski Club in Sheffield. She attended the Lady Manners School, a comprehensive school in Bakewell. Her father is a former mogul skier.

Career
She started mogul skiing in 2002.

By the age of 15 she had become the GBR Mogul skiing champion. and French Junior Champion

She was coached by Patrick D. Deneen, father of USA moguls competitor Patrick M. Deneen.

2010 Winter Olympics
In the 2010 Winter Olympics she was the youngest member of Team GB, aged 18. She was the youngest female ever to have competed in an Olympic freestyle skiing event. Great Britain only entered three freestyle skiers in three separate events. All three competitors were female.

In the actual competition, she came 24th out of 27. The first 20 qualified for the final.

Personal life
She used to live in Tideswell in the picturesque Derbyshire Dales. She now lives in Washington state with her husband and former fellow moguls Olympian, Patrick M. Deneen.

On 29 June 2012 she carried the Olympic flame through Ashbourne.

References

External links
 Her website
 Twitter
 British Freestyle Ski Team
 Snowsport England
 Fédération Internationale de Ski Profile

Video clips
 Profile at the BBC
 Interview in January 2009
 YouTube channel

1991 births
English female freestyle skiers
Freestyle skiers at the 2010 Winter Olympics
Olympic freestyle skiers of Great Britain
People from Tideswell
Sportspeople from Derbyshire
Living people